Dear Nora is an indie pop band formed in Portland, Oregon in 1999 by songwriter, vocalist, and guitarist Katy Davidson, drummer and vocalist Marianna Ritchey, and bassist Ryan Wise. Ritchey and Wise were previously members of Wolf Colonel. They named their new band after Lewis & Clark College music professor Nora Beck. Dear Nora's first album, We'll Have a Time, was produced by Amy Linton of The Aislers Set and released on the Portland label Magic Marker Records in 2001.

After moving to San Francisco, Davidson continued to record under the name Dear Nora with a rotating cast of band members. The band released two more main albums, Mountain Rock (2004) and There Is No Home (2006), as well as several 7" singles and EPs. From 2004 to 2007, they performed locally in San Francisco and toured with musicians such as The Blow, Mirah, and YACHT.

After a tour of Florida with Casiotone for the Painfully Alone in 2008, Davidson retired the name Dear Nora, though they continue to record music. In 2006, Davidson moved to Los Angeles, where they and Ritchey recorded Just as God Made Us under the name Lloyd & Michael on States Rights Records. Davidson now resides in Portland and performs under the name "Key Losers."

In 2017, after a vinyl reissue of 'Mountain Rock', Katy Davidson reached out to several fellow musicians, Zach Burba, Gregory Campanile, and Stephen Steinbrink to play with them under the Dear Nora moniker, for the first time since 2008, on tour across the United States.

In May, 2018, Dear Nora released their fourth album Skulls Example on Orindal Records.

In October, 2022, Dear Nora released human futures on Orindal Records.

Discography

 2000 - Make You Smile (7"), Magic Marker Records
 2000 - Dreaming Out Loud (7"), Magic Marker Records
 2001 - We'll Have a Time, Magic Marker Records
 2002 - The New Year, Magic Marker Records 
 2003 - split w/ Mates of State (7"), Polyvinyl Records
 2004 - Mountain Rock, Magic Marker Records
 2005 - split w/ What the Kids Want (7"), Shake Got the Beets Records
 2006 - There is No Home, Magic Marker Records
 2008 - Three States: Rarities 1997-2007, Magic Marker Records
 2018 - Skulls Example, Orindal Records
 2022 - human futures, Orindal Records

References

External links 
[ Dear Nora] at Allmusic
Magic Marker Records
 
Review at SF Weekly
Review at PopMatters
Dear Nora: Sunset on Humanity

Indie rock musical groups from Oregon
Musical groups from Portland, Oregon
Polyvinyl Record Co. artists